(1493 – 22 August 1543) was a samurai lord of the Mizuno clan of feudal Japan. He was the father of Odai no Kata, the mother of shōgun Tokugawa Ieyasu. 

In 1533 by Mizuno Tadamasa built and ruled Kariya Castle. Tadamasa was also the father of Mizuno Nobumoto and Mizuno Tadashige.

Literature
Sadler, AL:  Shogun: The Life of Tokugawa Ieyasu . Tuttle Publishing, 1978. ISBN 978-4-8053-1042-7 . (In English)

Mizuno Tadamasa
Mizuno Tadamasa
Samurai
Mizuno clan
Place of birth unknown
Place of death missing
Date of birth unknown